Phoenicus sanguinipennis is a species of beetle in the family Cerambycidae, the only species in the genus Phoenicus.

References

Trachyderini